The Khanaka (Khonaqoh) is a river of western Tajikistan. A right tributary of the Kofarnihon, it passes through the town of Hisor.

References

Rivers of Tajikistan